Thermal diffusion may refer to:
 A thermal force on a gas due to a temperature gradient, also called thermal diffusion or Thermal transpiration.
 It is used to drive a gas pump with no moving parts called a Knudsen pump.
 It is the currently accepted theory for the rotation of the Crookes radiometer.
 Diffusion in a temperature gradient, also called thermodiffusion or thermophoresis.
 It can be used as an obsolete method of making enriched uranium (see enriched uranium § thermal diffusion).
 Thermal diffusion can be used to measure fluid flow, including perfusion and rCBF at one location over time.
 Brownian motion (at a constant non-zero absolute temperature).
See also:
 Molecular diffusion
 Heat conduction (i.e., diffusion of heat)